Matthew or Matt Stewart may refer to:

Matthew Stewart, 4th Earl of Lennox (1516–1571), father of Henry Stewart, King of the Scots
Matthew Stewart, 2nd Earl of Lennox (1460–1513), Scottish nobleman
Matthew Stewart (mathematician) (1717–1785), Scottish mathematician
Matthew Stewart (philosopher) (born 1963), American philosopher and author from Santa Barbara, California
Matthew Stuart (philosopher) (born 1967), American philosopher and Locke Historian
Mattie Stewart (born 1973), Scottish rugby union player
Matt Stewart (American football) (born 1979), American football linebacker and long snapper
Matt Stuart (photographer) (born 1974), British photographer
Matthew Stewart (British Army officer) (1784–1851), Scottish colonel in the Black Watch
Matthew Stewart (moderator) (1881–1952), Scottish minister, moderator of the General Assembly of the Church of Scotland